Slovenia (SLO) competed at the 2005 Mediterranean Games in Almería, Spain. The nation had a total number of 159 participants (98 men and 61 women).

Medals

Gold
 Athletics
Men's 100 metres: Matic Osovnikar
Men's 200 metres: Matic Osovnikar
Women's 200 metres: Alenka Bikar

 Gymnastics
Men's Parallel Bars: Mitja Petkovšek

 Swimming
Men's 200 m backstroke: Blaž Medvešek
Men's 50 m breaststroke: Emil Tahirovič
Men's 100 m breaststroke: Peter Mankoč
Men's 4×100 m medley relay: Blaž Medvešek, Emil Tahirovič, Jernej Mencinger, and Peter Mankoč
Women's 200 m individual medley: Anja Klinar

Silver
 Athletics
Men's Discus: Igor Primc

 Judo
Men's Extra-Lightweight (– 60 kg): Rok Drakšič
Men's Half-Middleweight (– 81 kg): Klemen Ferjan
Women's Middleweight (– 70 kg): Raša Sraka

 Swimming
Men's 200 m butterfly: Aleš Aberšek
Women's 200 m freestyle: Sara Isakovič
Women's 400 m freestyle: Sara Isakovič
Women's 400 m individual medley: Anja Klinar

Bronze
 Archery
Women's Team Competition: Barbara Križe, Darja Verbič, and Dolores Čekada

 Athletics
Men's 4 × 100 metres: Matic Osovnikar, Matjaž Borovina, Boštjan Fridrih, Damjan Zlatnar, and Jan Žumer

 Bowls
Progressive Throw: Bojan Novak

 Boxing
Men's Light Heavyweight (– 81 kg): Robert Kramberger

 Judo
Women's Half-Lightweight (– 52 kg): Petra Nareks
Women's Half-Middleweight (– 63 kg): Urška Žolnir

 Karate
Women's – 55 kg: Teja Savor

 Rowing
Men's Single Sculls: Davor Mizerit
Men's Double Sculls: Rok Kolander and Matej Prelog

 Swimming
Men's 50 m freestyle: Jernej Godec
Men's 50 m breaststroke: Matjaž Markič
Men's 100 m breaststroke: Emil Tahirovič

Results by event

Archery
Men's Individual  
Matej Povž 
Matija Žlender 
Matej Zupanc

Women's Individual  
Barbara Križe 
Darja Verbič 
Dolores Čekada

Women's Team  
Barbara Križe 
Darja Verbič 
Dolores Čekada

Athletics
Alenka Bikar 
Matjaž Borovina 
Boštjan Fridrih
Brigita Langerholc 
Meta Mačus 
Teja Melink 
Sara Orešnik 
Matic Osovnikar 
Andrej Poljanec 
Rožle Prezelj 
Igor Primc 
Snežana Rodić 
Sonja Roman 
Jurij Rovan 
Miroslav Vodovnik 
Damjan Zlatnar 
Boštjan Šimunič 
Jan Žumer 
Kristina Žumer

Handball

Men's team competition
Preliminary round (group 4)
Defeated Italy (27:30)
Lost to Tunisia (23:25)
Quarterfinals
Lost to Serbia and Montenegro (30:33)
Classification Matches
5th/8th place: Defeated Greece (28:25)
5th/6th place: Lost to Egypt (30:31) → 6th place
Team roster
Dušan Podpečan 
Gregor Lorger 
Miladin Kozlina 
Rok Ivančič 
Boštjan Kavaš 
Jure Dobelšek
Boštjan Hribar 
Marko Oštir 
Jure Natek 
Goran Kozomara 
Robert Konečnik 
Aleš Pajovič 
Aleš Sirk 
Matjaž Mlakar 
Luka Žvižej 
Primož Prošt 
Head coach: Slavko Ivezič

Women's Team Competition
Team roster
Anja Argenti 
Maja Breznik 
Monika Frol 
Manuela Hrnjič 
Neli Irman 
Tadeja Korelc 
Miša Marinček 
Kristina Mihić 
Nina Potočnik 
Darja Rajšič 
Tina Sotler 
Urška Wertl 
Katja Čerenjak 
Tanja Čigoja
Biljana Čulibrk 
Jelena Čvorak
Head coach: Robert Begus

Judo
Matjaž Ceraj 
Rok Drakšič 
Klemen Ferjan 
Primož Ferjan 
Tina Kukec 
Petra Nareks 
Raša Sraka 
Urška Žolnir

Karate
Marijana Jularič 
Matjaž Končina 
Dejan Vozlič 
Teja Šavor

Swimming
Aleš Aberšek 
Jernej Godec 
Sara Isakovič 
Anja Klinar 
Peter Mankoč 
Matjaž Markič 
Blaž Medvešek 
Jernej Mencinger 
Marko Milenkovič 
Monika Močnik 
Jasna Ovsenik 
Matjaž Pernat 
Tamara Sambrailo 
Nina Sovinek 
Emil Tahirovič 
Luka Turk
Anja Čarman

Water polo
Boban Antonijevič 
Žiga Balderman 
Erik Bukovac 
Teo Galič 
Jernej Lovše 
Aleksander Mertelj 
Tomaž Mihelčič 
Jure Nastran 
Matej Nastran 
Primož Troppan 
Blaž Verač 
Miha Vreček 
Andrija Šulič

See also
 Slovenia at the 2004 Summer Olympics
 Slovenia at the 2008 Summer Olympics

References
 Official Site
 Slovenian Olympic Committee
 juegosmediterraneos

Nations at the 2005 Mediterranean Games
2005
Mediterranean Games